The BE-3 (Blue Engine 3) is a LH2/LOX rocket engine developed by Blue Origin.

The engine began development in the early 2010s, and completed acceptance testing in early 2015.  The engine is being used on the New Shepard suborbital rocket, for which test flights began in 2015 and a first crewed flight occurred in 2021.
The engine was under consideration by United Launch Alliance (ULA) for use in a new second stage, the Advanced Cryogenic Evolved Stage, in ULA's Vulcan orbital launch vehicle with first flight in the 2020s.

History 

Following Aerojet’s acquisition of Pratt & Whitney Rocketdyne in 2012, Blue Origin president Rob Meyerson saw an opportunity to fill a gap in the defense industrial base. Blue Origin publicly entered the liquid rocket engine business by partnering with ULA on the development of the BE-4, and working with other companies. Meyerson announced the selection of Huntsville, AL as the location of Blue Origin’s rocket production factory in June 2017.

The BE-3 follows the earliest rocket engine development efforts at Blue Origin in the 2000s.  Blue Origin's first engine was a "simple, single-propellant engine" called the Blue Engine-1 (BE-1) which used peroxide propellant and generated only  of thrust, and their second, the Blue Engine-2 (BE-2) which was a bipropellant engine using kerosene and peroxide, producing  thrust.

In January 2013, the company announced the development of the Blue Engine-3 BE-3, a new liquid hydrogen/liquid oxygen (LH2/LOX) cryogenic engine.  The engine was originally announced to produce  thrust, with initial thrust chamber tests planned for mid-February 2013 at NASA Stennis. The thrust chamber tests were run sometime in 2013.

The BE-3 was successfully tested in late 2013 on a full-duration simulated suborbital burn, with coast phases and engine relights, "demonstrating deep throttle, full power, long-duration and reliable restart all in a single-test sequence."  NASA has released a video of the test.

By December 2013, Blue Origin updated engine specifications following engine tests conducted on test stands at ground level, near sea level.

Additional testing of the BE-3 was completed in 2014, with the engine "simulating a sub-scale booster suborbital mission duty cycle."
Test stand testing of the engine was completed by April 2015, with over 450 engine firings and a cumulative engine test time of over 500 minutes.  Blue Origin stated it would make the first test flight of its New Shepard vehicle later in 2015, with the BE-3PM engine.

In the event, Blue Origin made the first flight test of the BE-3PM engine on the New Shepard suborbital vehicle before the month was out, flying a boost profile to  altitude on 29 April 2015.

In April 2015, United Launch Alliance (ULA) was considering the BE-3 for use in a new second stage, the Advanced Cryogenic Evolved Stage (ACES), which was planned to become the primary upper stage for ULA's Vulcan orbital launch vehicle in the 2020s.  The Vulcan was planned to begin orbital flights in 2019 with an existing Centaur upper stage, and was considering three engines from various manufacturers for the ACES stage which would putatively begin flight in 2023, with selection expected before 2019.

While development of a sea-level version of the engine, BE-3PM, was completed and fully qualified by early 2015, Blue Origin said then that they intend to develop a vacuum version of the engine to operate in space.

In January 2016, the US Air Force provided partial development funding to Orbital ATK to develop an extendable nozzle for the Blue Origin BE-3U.

On 20 July, 2021, the engine design was used in its first crewed flight of the New Shepard.

On September 12, 2022, New Shepard 3 with RSS H.G. Wells capsule suffered an un-contained engine failure that resulted in the triggering of a launch abort and the loss of the vehicle.

Engine design

BE-3PM 
The first stage variant of the BE-3, the BE-3PM, uses a pump-fed engine design, with a combustion tap-off cycle to take a small amount of combustion gases from the main combustion chamber in order to  power the engine turbopumps.

BE-3U 

Blue Origin has developed an open expander cycle variant of the BE-3, the BE-3U.  Two of these engines will be used to power the New Glenn second stage.  

Development had begun on the extendable nozzle for BE-3U by early 2016.
By August 2018, BE-3U engine development had proceeded, test engines built, and had accumulated over 700 seconds of test time, confirming performance assumptions in the design.

In February 2020, Blue Origin opened up a factory in Huntsville, Alabama, to produce BE-3U and BE-4 engines.

Technical specifications 
The performance of the sea-level version of the BE-3, the BE-3PM, include:
Thrust:  at full power
Throttle reduction capability:

See also 
 BE-4
 Comparison of orbital rocket engines

References

External links 
 

Blue Origin rocket engines
Rocket engines using hydrogen propellant
Rocket engines using the tap-off cycle
Rocket engines of the United States
New Shepard